Louis Andrew "Lou" Michaels (originally Majka) (September 28, 1935 – January 19, 2016) was an American football player who was a standout defensive lineman for the University of Kentucky Wildcats from 1955 to 1957. After Kentucky's victory over archrival Tennessee in 1957, Michaels has been quoted saying, "Nothing sucks like a Big Orange." Michaels played professionally for 14 years, 1958–71, with the Los Angeles Rams, Pittsburgh Steelers, Baltimore Colts and Green Bay Packers of the National Football League (NFL). He also played placekicker, and was selected to the Pro Bowl after the 1962 and 1963 seasons.  In 1962, Michaels  led the league in field goals made.  He finished his career with a 54.8% field goal percentage and 955 points.  

By 1969 he was almost exclusively a placekicker for the Colts but after a season in which he was successful on less than half his field goal attempts and struggled especially with longer kicks, rookie Jim O'Brien won the Colts placekicking job in the 1970 preseason and Michaels was waived.  After sitting out the 1970 season he tried out with the Packers in their 1971 training camp and won their place kicking job.  After playing the first 10 games of the Packers' season he was placed on the taxi squad and rookie Tim Webster replaced him for the last 4 games of the season.  After being listed behind Webster and rookie Chester Marcol on the Packers' preseason depth chart in 1972, Michaels did not report the Packers' training camp and the team waived him.

Michaels was inducted into the College Football Hall of Fame in 1992 and into the National Polish American Sports Hall of Fame in 1994. His brother, Walt Michaels, also played in the NFL. 

Michaels died January 19, 2016, from pancreatic cancer.

Personal life
Michaels was born to a Polish family, son of a coal miner from Swoyersville, Pennsylvania. The family's surname is originally Majka, but was anglicized to Michaels in school.

References

1935 births
2016 deaths
American football defensive ends
American football placekickers
Baltimore Colts players
Green Bay Packers players
Kentucky Wildcats football players
Los Angeles Rams players
Pittsburgh Steelers players
All-American college football players
College Football Hall of Fame inductees
Eastern Conference Pro Bowl players
People from Swoyersville, Pennsylvania
Players of American football from Pennsylvania
American people of Polish descent
Deaths from pancreatic cancer
Deaths from cancer in Pennsylvania